Soprana was a comune (municipality) in the Province of Biella in the Italian region Piedmont, located about  northeast of Turin and about  northeast of Biella.

Soprana bordered the following municipalities: Curino, Mezzana Mortigliengo, Trivero.

As a comune it had the following frazioni (villages):Baltigati, Lanvario, Cerreia, Cerruti, Molinengo.

History 
From 1 January 2019 Soprana was absorbed by the new-born municipality of Valdilana.

Demographic evolution

References

Cities and towns in Piedmont
Former municipalities of the Province of Biella
Frazioni of Valdilana